Fly Through the Country is the second studio album by the progressive bluegrass band New Grass Revival, released in 1975 on the Flying Fish label. It is also the title of the fifth song on the album.

In 1992, When the Storm is Over and Fly Through the Country were re-released on one CD.

Track listing
 "Skippin' in the Mississippi Dew" (John Hartford) - 2:37
 "Good Woman's Love" (Cy Coben) - 3:16
 "Glory" (Steven F. Brines & Sam Bush) - 3:04
 "All Night Train" (Steven F. Brines & Sam Bush) - 3:12
 "Fly Through the Country" (Jim Webb) - 5:16
 "This Heart of Mine" (Steven F. Brines & Jim Smoak) - 2:10
 "The Dancer" (Steven F. Brines & Sam Bush) - 3:44
 "When She Made Laughter Easy" (Steven F. Brines & Sam Bush) - 3:16
 "Doin' My Time" (Jimmie Skinner & Fred Rose) - 6:21
 "These Days" (Jackson Browne) - 5:41

Personnel 
 Sam Bush - mandolin, lead vocals, violin, slide mandolin, acoustic guitar, electric guitar
 John Cowan - electric bass, lead vocals
 Courtney Johnson - banjo, vocals
 Curtis Burch - guitar, Dobro, vocals
 Chuck Cochran - Electric piano

References 

New Grass Revival albums
1975 albums